Fada may refer to:

Places 

 Fada, Chad, the capital of the Ennedi-Ouest region of Chad
 Fada, Nigeria, a town in central Nigeria
 Fada N'gourma, a town in eastern Burkina Faso
 Fada, Cameroon, a village in the Adamawa Region of Cameroon
 Loch Fada, Colonsay, a lake on the Inner Hebridean island of Colonsay, Scotland

Abbreviation 

 Federation of Automobile Dealers' Associations of India
 Federación Argentina de Ajedrez, Argentinian chess federation
 First Amendment Defense Act, 2015 proposed US legislation
 First Assistant District Attorney

Other 

 Fada (síneadh fada), the  acute accent in Irish orthography
 Fada Cola, a soft drink from Marseille, France